The 2016 CrownBet Darwin Triple Crown was a motor racing event for V8 Supercars, held on the weekend of 17 to 19 June 2016. The event was held at Hidden Valley Raceway in Darwin, Northern Territory, and consisted of one race of 120 kilometres and one race of 200 km in length. It was the sixth event of fourteen in the 2016 International V8 Supercars Championship and hosted Races 12 and 13 of the season. The event was the 19th running of the Darwin Triple Crown.

The first race of the weekend was won by Michael Caruso, his first victory since 2009 and the first for Nissan Motorsport since 2013. Shane van Gisbergen had started from pole position but incurred a drive-through penalty for illegally overtaking Caruso on a safety car restart. Van Gisbergen recovered to win the second race from pole position. The second race was marred by two major incidents on the first lap, one of which left Lee Holdsworth in hospital with fractures to his pelvis, right knee and two ribs. The other involved James Moffat, Fabian Coulthard and Chaz Mostert and caused major damage to Coulthard's car. Jamie Whincup took the championship lead by finishing second in Race 12, while the leader coming into the event, Mark Winterbottom, dropped to fourth place after finishing 20th in Race 13.

Report

Background 
Various personnel changes took place at a number of teams ahead of the event. Todd Kelly's race engineer Jesse Walker left Nissan Motorsport following the Winton event; he was replaced by the team's engineering manager, Perry Kapper. Campbell Little, who had engineered David Reynolds' car for Erebus Motorsport in the first five events of the season, switched to Lucas Dumbrell Motorsport to work with Andre Heimgartner. His role at Erebus Motorsport was taken by the team's general manager, Barry Ryan. Significant changes were made by the Holden Racing Team, with Garth Tander's race engineer Blake Smith being dismissed while James Courtney's engineer Alistair McVean was moved into another role. They were replaced by Alex Somerset and Rob Starr respectively.

A one-off livery for Craig Lowndes' car was revealed by Triple Eight Race Engineering on the Thursday prior to the event. The livery featured artwork designed by a local Indigenous student, and was done in support of the Clontarf Foundation. Fabian Coulthard's car also featured a different livery, with sponsorship from Australian paint company Taubmans, as part of DJR Team Penske's system of rotational sponsors. Coulthard's teammate Scott Pye took part in a new chassis, as did Mark Winterbottom for Prodrive Racing Australia.

A change was made to the drop gear ratio compared to the previous year's event, where cars were reaching the rev limiter on the main straight. The ratio change was aimed to reduce the amount of time that cars spent on the limiter, lessening the risk of damage to the drivetrain. Overtaking at the first corner was made easier, as the top speed of the cars on the main straight was no longer restricted by the limiter.

During the 2015 event, there was controversy when Reynolds went off the circuit at Turn 5, but maintained the race lead by rejoining at Turn 7. A similar incident involving Jason Bright occurred at Sydney Motorsport Park later in the season. The issue was addressed ahead of the 2016 event, with drivers who short-cut the circuit now required to drop behind the last car on the lead lap.

Winterbottom entered the event as the championship leader, 27 points clear of Scott McLaughlin.

Practice 
The first practice session was run on Friday morning and was one hour in length. Two Enduro Cup co-drivers completed laps during the session: Matt Campbell in Todd Kelly's car and Macauley Jones in Tim Blanchard's car. Rick Kelly set a lap time of 1:07.0515 to be fastest, ahead of Triple Eight Race Engineering teammates Jamie Whincup and Shane van Gisbergen. Numerous drivers went off the circuit during the session, including James Moffat who hit the tyre wall at Turn 10. Coulthard's engine had a misfire, prompting DJR Team Penske to change the engine for the second one-hour practice session, which was held in the afternoon. Coulthard missed the first half of the session while the change was carried out. Despite this, he set the sixth fastest time. The fastest time was set by Whincup, with Rick Kelly second fastest ahead of Van Gisbergen. Aaren Russell hit the wall at Turn 10 halfway through the session, damaging the front of his car. He did not take part in the rest of the session. Ford drivers dominated the final 15-minute practice session, held on Saturday morning. Pye was fastest ahead of Chaz Mostert, Winterbottom and Coulthard.

Qualifying – Race 12 
Qualifying for Race 12 was a single 15-minute session held on Saturday morning. The session began with cloud cover over the circuit and Van Gisbergen took advantage of the resulting lower track temperature to set a time of 1:06.0923, which would prove to be fast enough for pole position. Other drivers improved their times later in the session despite the track temperature rising, with Michael Caruso's time of 1:06.1754 being the closest to Van Gisbergen's time. Will Davison qualified third ahead of Mostert and Winterbottom.

Race 12 
Race 12 took place on Saturday afternoon, with regulations requiring each car to make at least one pit stop to change all four tyres. Caruso made a better start than Van Gisbergen and took the lead going into the first corner. At Turn 5, Tim Slade touched the rear of Rick Kelly's car, causing Kelly to hit and spin Lowndes. Slade was not penalised, with the stewards calling the contact a racing incident. Tander was also involved in contact on the first lap, losing his driver's door, while Nick Percat retired from the race with suspension damage. The safety car was deployed to allow marshals to collect Tander's door. The race was restarted at the end of lap 3 and Van Gisbergen made contact with Caruso at the final corner, allowing him to take the lead on the run to the line. However, as Van Gisbergen passed Caruso before the control line, he was given a drive-through penalty. After the race Van Gisbergen admitted that the move was his mistake. The restart also saw Whincup and Pye make contact, with the latter scraping the wall on the pit straight.

Davison, who had taken advantage of Van Gisbergen's move to also pass Caruso, inherited the lead when Van Gisbergen served his penalty. Caruso made his pit stop on lap 11 and began setting fast lap times, which enabled him to move in front of Davison after the latter had completed his pit stop. DJR Team Penske teammates Pye and Coulthard ran a longer first stint, pitting on laps 19 and 24 respectively. Van Gisbergen was the last driver to make his pit stop, doing so on lap 33. This left Caruso in the lead ahead of Whincup and Mostert, with the top three remaining the same at the finish. It was Caruso's first win since the corresponding event in 2009. Pye and Coulthard utilised their younger tyres to move up to fifth and sixth respectively, behind Davison. With Winterbottom and McLaughlin finishing ninth and tenth, Whincup took the championship lead.

Qualifying – Race 13 
Qualifying for Race 13 took place on Sunday morning and consisted of a 20-minute session followed by a top ten shootout for the fastest ten qualifiers. Lowndes set a time of 1:06.0259 to be fastest in the qualifying session ahead of Rick Kelly and Mostert. Slade, Caruso, McLaughlin, Van Gisbergen, Winterbottom, Whincup and Todd Kelly completed the top ten and progressed to the top ten shootout.

The top ten shootout saw each of the ten drivers complete one flying lap each, in reverse order of their qualifying positions. Todd Kelly ran first and set a time of 1:06.7320. Whincup made a mistake and ran wide at the final corner, leaving him over one second behind Kelly's time. Winterbottom was also unable to beat Kelly's time, but Van Gisbergen's set a time of 1:06.6797, which would prove to be good enough for pole position. None of the remaining drivers were able to go faster than Winterbottom, leaving Van Gisbergen, Todd Kelly and Winterbottom as the top three. Slade was fourth fastest ahead of Rick Kelly, Lowndes, McLaughlin and Mostert. Caruso ran wide at Turn 1, leaving him ninth fastest ahead of Whincup.

Race 13 
Race 13 was held on Sunday afternoon and the race regulations required each car to take on at least 120 litres of fuel during the race. Todd Kelly took the lead at the start before the safety car was deployed due to two major crashes in the first half of the lap. On the exit of the first corner,  Bright was bumped into Lee Holdsworth who then went off the track and made heavy side-on contact with a concrete barrier. Holdsworth was taken to Royal Darwin Hospital after being extracted from his car. Moffat, Coulthard and Mostert had a separate incident at Turn 4, with the trio attempting to run three-wide before Moffat and Coulthard made contact. Coulthard spun and collected Mostert, who had taken to the grass to try to avoid contact, with both hitting the outside wall. Mostert's car continued on the grass and went across the circuit at Turn 5 while Coulthard's car bounced back onto the track on the exit of Turn 4. Mostert was able to return to the pits for repairs and rejoined the race multiple laps off the lead.

The deployment of the safety car saw all of the other drivers make a pit stop at the end of the first lap, with multiple drivers being forced to park in the pit lane while their teammate's car was serviced first. This hindered some of the drivers and Lowndes emerged as the leader ahead of Todd Kelly, Winterbottom, Van Gisbergen, Slade and Courtney. After the race restarted, Winterbottom ran into the back of Kelly at Turn 1, sending the latter wide and earning himself a drive-through penalty. Pye made contact with Caruso at Turn 6, damaging his suspension which eventually caused him to stop on the pit straight. The safety car was deployed again and a number of drivers down the order took the opportunity to pit and take on more of the minimum fuel requirement. Van Gisbergen took the lead from Lowndes at the restart and led through the second and final round of pit stops for the leaders, which took place around lap 33.

Once all drivers had completed their pit stops, Van Gisbergen led from Slade, Lowndes, Davison and Courtney. Blanchard was running in eleventh place when he suffered a puncture on lap 56, forcing him to make a pit stop. The safety car made another appearance to enable the tyre debris to be cleared. Winterbottom made contact with Russell on lap 63 and received a second drive-through penalty, leaving him in 20th place. Despite the safety car period, Van Gisbergen went on to take victory over Slade and Lowndes, with Davison and Courtney completing the top five. Whincup finished eighth but maintained the championship lead, 30 points clear of Lowndes with McLaughlin in third, a further 15 points behind.

Post-race 
It was revealed after the race that Holdsworth had suffered fractures to his pelvis, right knee and two ribs, as well as minor injuries to his chest and left elbow, with data from his car showing a peak load of 56 g during the crash. Holdsworth was transferred to Freemasons Hospital in Melbourne on 21 June, where it was confirmed that he did not require surgery. Holdsworth said of the crash: "I remember hitting and feeling pain straight away shoot up through my whole body really, mostly the left side of my body ... I came to a stop and I couldn’t breathe and I was screaming and just couldn’t get my breath back."

Winterbottom called the race "one of my worst efforts in a race car", admitting fault for the incident with Todd Kelly but saying he was frustrated with the second penalty, claiming he had been forced wide by Russell at the preceding corner.

Results

Race 12

Qualifying

Race

Race 13

Qualifying

Top Ten Shootout

Race

Championship standings after the event 
 After Race 13 of 29. Only the top five positions are included for both sets of standings.

Drivers' Championship standings

Teams' Championship standings

References 

CrownBet Darwin Triple Crown
CrownBet Darwin Triple Crown
Sport in Darwin, Northern Territory
2010s in the Northern Territory
Motorsport in the Northern Territory